Sir William le Vavasour of Hazlewood, (c. 1131 - 29 June 1191) was the 1st Lord of Hazlewood, a prominent judge, a powerful land owner in Yorkshire (Hazlewood Castle) and one of the witnesses to the Charters of Sawley Abbey. William was born in Yorkshire, England to a noble Norman family. His father Sir Mauger le Vavasour III was a prominent knight and his great-grandfather Sir Mauger le Vavasour was the door-keeper to William the Conqueror. William is the patriarch and founder of the Vavasour family.

Sources 

1130s births
1191 deaths
People from Selby District
Normans in England
William